Jeffrey Allan Segal (born October 3, 1956) is an American political scientist who serves as a SUNY Distinguished Professor at Stony Brook University, where he was formerly the chair of the Political Science Department. He received a Guggenheim Fellowship in political science in 2011 and was named a fellow of the American Academy of Arts and Sciences in 2012. He formerly served as a Visiting Professor of American Politics at Harvard University, as a Visiting Senior Research Scholar at the Center for the Study of Democratic Politics at Princeton University, and as president of the Midwest Political Science Association.

References

External links
Faculty page

Living people
1956 births
American political scientists
Stony Brook University faculty
Fellows of the American Academy of Arts and Sciences
University at Albany, SUNY alumni
Michigan State University alumni